The 1930 Copa del Rey Final was the 30th final of the Copa del Rey, the Spanish football cup competition. Athletic Bilbao beat Real Madrid 3–2 and won their tenth title.

Match details

See also
El Viejo Clásico

References

1930
Copa
Real Madrid CF matches
Athletic Bilbao matches